KatzSmith Productions is an American film production company, founded by Seth Grahame-Smith and David Katzenberg. The company is known for producing the 2017 horror film It.

Overview
In 2011, Seth Grahame-Smith and David Katzenberg launched KatzSmith Productions, with the company's first film being the 2017 film It.

On July 3, 2018 it was announced that Metro-Goldwyn-Mayer, Orion Pictures and KatzSmith Productions were producing Child's Play, a remake of the 1988 film of the same name. The film will star Gabriel Bateman, Aubrey Plaza and Brian Tyree Henry.

Filmography

Films

Upcoming films

Television

Reception

Box office

Critical reception

References

Mass media companies established in 2011
Film production companies of the United States